Sørvágs Ítróttarfelag, commonly known as SÍ, is a sports association based in Sørvágur, Faroe Islands. It was founded on 17 March 1905.

Football
Founded in 1905, SÍ won its first and only title in the Faroese top division in 1947. In 1998, SÍ became part of FS Vágar; they left at the end of 2002, but merged again after the 2007 season to form 07 Vestur.

Honours
Faroe Islands Premier League: 1
1947
2. deild: 3
1978, 1987, 2005
3. deild: 1
2003

Volleyball
SÍ is one of the most successful volleyball clubs in the Faroe Islands, having won the league six times, and the cup seven times with the men's team, and three and four times, respectively, with the women's team.

Honours
Faroese Volleyball League: 6
2005, 2008, 2010, 2012, 2016, 2017
Faroese Volleyball Cup: 7
2002, 2005, 2008, 2010, 2012, 2015, 2018
Faroese Women's Volleyball League: 4
2008, 2009, 2010, 2021
Faroese Women's Volleyball Cup: 5
2009, 2010, 2019, 2020, 2021

See also
List of sport associations in the Faroe Islands

References

External links
SÍ former website . 
Social media account

Association football clubs established in 1905
1905 establishments in the Faroe Islands
Defunct football clubs in the Faroe Islands